The 2019–20 season was Juventus Football Club's 122nd in existence and 13th consecutive season in the top-flight of Italian football. In addition to the domestic league, Juventus competed in the Coppa Italia, losing to Napoli in the final, Supercoppa Italiana, and the Champions League.

Players

Squad information
Players and squad numbers last updated on 22 February 2020. Appearances include league matches only.Note: Flags indicate national team as has been defined under FIFA eligibility rules. Players may hold more than one non-FIFA nationality.

a. Additional costs of €16 million to be paid over the next two financial years.
b. Additional costs of €12 million to be paid.

Transfers

Summer 2019

In

Out

Other acquisitions

Other disposals

Winter 2019–20

In

Out

Other acquisitions

Other disposals

End of season

Other disposals

Pre-season and friendlies

Competitions

Overview

Serie A

League table

Results summary

Results by round

Matches

Coppa Italia

Supercoppa Italiana

UEFA Champions League

Group stage

Knockout phase

Round of 16

Statistics

Appearances and goals

|-
! colspan=14 style=background:#DCDCDC; text-align:center| Goalkeepers

|-
! colspan=14 style=background:#DCDCDC; text-align:center| Defenders

|-
! colspan=14 style=background:#DCDCDC; text-align:center| Midfielders

|-
! colspan=14 style=background:#DCDCDC; text-align:center| Forwards

|-
! colspan="18" style="background:#dcdcdc; text-align:center"| Players transferred/loaned out during the season

Goalscorers

Last updated: 7 August 2020

Disciplinary record

Last updated: 6 January 2020

See also 
 2019–20 Juventus F.C. (women) season
 2019–20 Juventus F.C. Under-23 season

Notes

A.  The match was called off at the 51st minute due to the annual tradition of pitch invasion.

References

Juventus F.C. seasons
Juventus
Juventus
Italian football championship-winning seasons